He is the winner of a range international awards Marat Aldangaruly Sarsembaev (born December 15, 1947) is a Kazakh doctor of law and professor.

Sarsembaev is a member of the Central Election Commission of the Republic of Kazakhstan, appointed by the Decree of the President of the Republic of Kazakhstan in 2007. Sarsembaev was born in the village of Ekpendy, Andreevsky district (now Alakolsky), Taldy-Kurgan (now Almaty) region in the Kazakh Soviet Socialist Republic (now Kazakhstan). 

Sarsembaev finished Andreevsky Russian high school in 1965. Sarsembayev graduated from the faculty of English language of Almaty Institute of foreign languages (now the Kazakh university of international relations and world languages) in 1969 with honours. In 1973 he graduated from the faculty of law of the Kazakh state university (now the Kazakh national university) with honours. He gained his doctorate in 1994 with a thesis on the theme of International law issues in the "History of Kazakhstan and Central Asia (from the 15th century to the present)" at the Institute of State and Law at the Russian Academy of Sciences in Moscow, Russian Federation. In 2012, he became a member of the UN Human Rights Committee.

Career 
Marat Sarsembaev takes part in sessions of the dissertational boards of candidates and doctors' theses at the faculties of Kazakhstani and foreign universities (Russia, Uzbekistan, France, etc.) as a member of dissertational councils, scientific adviser (supervisor) and as an expert on the commissions of dissertational councils on international law and law of Kazakhstan, world economics and international relations.

He is involved in the process of the formulation and editing of bills, drafts of codes and international treaties of the Republic of Kazakhstan as an expert on customs, tax, labour codes in the parliament, CEC, Constitutional Council, and other ministries and departments of the Republic of Kazakhstan, and current laws of the Republic of Kazakhstan concerning foreign policy and internal problems of the country.

He was President of the Association of educational institutions of the republic from 1996 to 2001. He lectured in the MSIIR in 1977, university of Rennes, in 1980, Villanova university  in 1994, Indiana University (USA) in 1997, Kabul university (Afghanistan) in 1985–1987: in all at 10 domestic and 6 foreign universities.

He has won many international awards and competitions, including a Fulbright Award as a Fulbright Research Scholar (named after J. William Fulbright). In this capacity he was in the USA for 10 months in 1997 "conducting research on the formation of private property law in the U.S. and other countries for a project on the problems of property law in domestic and international law" according to Indiana Law Annotated.

He is the winner of the Soros-Kazakhstan Fund which is awarded for the high school textbook International law being recognized as the best among 120 textbooks sent to the republican competition of 1995. The competition was held with the assistance of the Ministry of еducation and science of the Republic of Kazakhstan.

Member of Legal Policy Board at the President of the Republic of Kazakhstan, a member of Executive committee of Russian Association of international law.

From 1973 to 2000 he was the dean of the faculty of law and head of international law at the Kazakhstan National University. He was the rector of Daneker University, director of, and professor at, the Law institute of the L. N. Gumilyov Eurasian National University. He worked as the head of Department for International Relations of the Central Election Commission of the Republic of Kazakhstan in Astana city. At present he is a member of CEC of the Republic of Kazakhstan as a political office employee.

As a member of the Kazakhstan delegation he polemicized with representatives of the OSCE in Warsaw repeatedly. Sarsembaev is a member of the editorial boards of the Moscow Journal of International Law, Kazakhstan Journal of International Law, Bulletin of L. N. Gumilyov Eurasian National University, and Bulletin of D. A. Kunaev Eurasian Law Academy.

Sarsembaev speaks Kazakh, Russian and English fluently.

Personal life
Sarsembaev has two brothers, Talgat and Каirat, and two sisters, Zhamal and Kamal. He and his wife Umsynkul have 3 sons Kanat, Timur and Daniyar.

Accolades 

 Honourable citizen of El Paso (Texas, United States)
 Honourable citizen of Houston (Texas, USA)
 10 years of independence of the Respublic of Kazakhstan medal
 "Astana" medal
 "10 years of the Constitution of the Republic of Kazakhstan" medal
 "Ерен енбегі үшін" medal (or honourable labour)

Written works 
Sarsembaev has more than 440 works in the Kazakh, Russian, Dari, English, French, German, Hebrew, Кorean, Polish, Romanian, Turkish, Japanese languages on Kazakhstan and foreign and international law published in Kazakhstan, Russian Federation, Afghanistan, Austria, Germany, Great Britain, Israel, Japan, Poland, Romania, Turkey, United States.

His most notable works are 14 monographs, textbooks and manuals: 
 Promoting the world and friendship – Alma-Ata: Kazakhstan, 1984. – 68 p.
 Afghanistan and international law (in Dari) – Kabul: Kabul university, 1987. – 218 p.
 International law in the history of Kazakhstan and Central Asia – Alma-Ata: Ana tili, 1991. – 152 p.
 International law relations of the states of Central Asia – Almaty: Gylym, 1995. – 368 p.
 International law – Almaty: Zheti zhargy, 1996. – 448 p. (in Russian), in 1999 it was published in Ankara, Turkey, in the Turkish language.
 International private law (the editor-in-chief and the coauthor) – Almaty: Gylym, 1996. – 282 p., in 1999 it was published in Ankara in the Turkish language.
 Customs Law – Almaty: Gylym, 1997. – 228 p.
 Prospects of foreign trade activities: law and international experience – Almaty: Gylym, 1998. – 310 p.
 Diplomatic and consular law – Almaty: Daneker, 1999. – 298 p.
 Relations of Russia (USSR) and Kazakhstan with Afghanistan – Almaty: Daneker, 2002. – 212 p.
 International space law and the Republic of Kazakhstan – Almaty: L.Gumilev Eurasian national university, Daneker, 2003. – 182 p. and others.

References

Kazakhstani politicians
1947 births
Legal scholars
Living people
United Nations Human Rights Committee members
Academic staff of Al-Farabi Kazakh National University
Kazakhstani officials of the United Nations
Academic staff of L. N. Gumilyov Eurasian National University